Twerton on Avon railway station is a former railway station in Bath, Somerset.

Architecture and Opening

Twerton was named after the village that it served (west of Bath on the south bank of the Avon) though at the time it was also called Twiverton.  The station was built in Gothic style variously called Tudor or Jacobethan. This style is seen from the tunnel mouths west of Twerton to Bath Spa station including many arches and embellishment in the viaduct itself. This is something of a contrast to the Georgian buildings in the centre of Bath north of the river, but is reflected in the Victorian domestic architecture on the southern suburbs. It opened as a railway station on 16 December 1840 for Great Western Railway services from Bristol. Four trains a day stopped at Twerton in each direction (out of eleven services each way between Bath and Bristol).

Subsequent history
Twerton station was operated by the Great Western Railway but was renamed Twerton on Avon in 1899 to avoid confusion with Tiverton.

Closure

The station was closed in 1917 as an economy measure during the First World War. Passenger traffic into Bath had been reduced by competition from the electric tram line which terminated in Twerton, and the station was not reopened after the end of the war. In 1929 Oldfield Park station was opened nearby (but closer to Bath).

Current uses
The station building like the viaduct on which it sits is a Grade II listed structure, but was boarded up as of May 2006 and appears to be abandoned. A roadside cafe operates from its forecourt, but does not occupy any original parts of the station. In December 2017, a local resident, Sean Dudden, proposed the reopening of the station.

References

External links
 www.twerton.com - Twerton Community Site

Disused railway stations in Bath, Somerset
Former Great Western Railway stations
Great Western Main Line
Railway stations in Great Britain opened in 1840
Railway stations in Great Britain closed in 1917